Evan Todd (born February 25, 1989) is an American actor and producer.

Life and career
Todd grew up in Kissimmee, Florida. He is of Italian descent. He finished his senior year of high school at the North Carolina School of the Arts in Winston-Salem and later graduated from the Juilliard School. Todd also studied at Yale School of Drama and London Academy of Music and Dramatic Art.

In 2007, Todd made his big screen debut as a student in the 2007 film Sydney White. He subsequently appeared in several television films and series such as Grumpy Cat's Worst Christmas Ever (2014), Switched at Birth and Jane the Virgin. In 2014, he originated the role of Kurt Kelly in Heathers: The Musical, when the rock musical had a production Off-Broadway. The following year, Todd co-produced the 2015 Broadway revival of Spring Awakening. A critical success, the rock musical, based on the German play Spring Awakening (1891) by Frank Wedekind, was nominated for both a Tony Award and a Drama Desk Award for Outstanding Revival of a Musical.

In 2016, Todd had a leading role in the comedy film 4th Man Out about a young mechanic who comes out to his straight buddies and to his family. The film received the Audience Choice Award for Best Dramatic Feature at Outfest, and was awarded the Audience Award for Best Narrative Feature at the InsideOut LGBT Film Festival. In March 2017, Todd joined the Broadway cast of Beautiful: The Carole King Musical as King’s songwriter first husband and writing partner Gerry Goffin. In 2022, he played Mark in the world premiere production of Which Way to the Stage off-Broadway.

Todd is openly gay. He is the co-founder of stART and artsINSIDEOUT, two summer arts empowerment programs benefiting students from his home town as well as children affected by HIV in South Africa.

Filmography

References

External links
 
 

1989 births
21st-century American male actors
American male film actors
American male television actors
American people of Italian descent
Living people
LGBT producers
American gay actors
Broadway theatre producers